Pommeréval is a commune in the Seine-Maritime department in the Normandy region in northern France.

Geography

Population

Places of interest
 The church of St.Jacques, dating from the seventeenth century.
 Traces of a feudal castle.

See also
Communes of the Seine-Maritime department

References

Communes of Seine-Maritime